Klepikovsky (masculine), Klepikovskaya (feminine), or Klepikovskoye (neuter) may refer to:
Klepikovsky District, a district of Ryazan Oblast, Russia
Klepikovskaya, a rural locality (a village) in Vologda Oblast, Russia